Florida Scenic Highways are a collection of scenic highways in Florida organized and managed by the Florida Department of Transportation, through the Florida Scenic Highways Program.  Each highway passes through or connects sites that the state of Florida determines to be of cultural, historic, archaeological, recreational, natural and/or scenic significance found along Florida's highway system. The State uses the scenic highway designations to promote resource preservation and enhancement, promote tourism and economic development, and educate travelers. Florida has 27 state-designated scenic byways. Six of these byways are also National Scenic Byways, and two have been designated federally with the status of All-American Road.



List of scenic highways

General Photos

See also

References

External links
 Florida Scenic Highway

 Scenic
 
Florida Scenic Highways